Darryl Maurice Brinkley (born December 23, 1968) is an American former professional baseball player and manager. He played one season in the KBO League for the Hyundai Unicorns in 2000. In 2007, he became the first player in Northern League history to bat .400. A journeyman minor leaguer, his one chance at playing in the majors was prevented by the September 11, 2001 terrorist attacks.

Career
Brinkley graduated from Sacred Heart University in 1991, however was not drafted by any Major League Baseball team despite batting .528 in his senior year.  Brinkley instead played in the Netherlands and Italy for three years before signing with the Winnipeg Goldeyes of the independent Northern League. Brinkley had an outstanding winter season playing in the Mexican Pacific League in 1996 where he was named Baseball America's Winter Player of the year, as well as MVP of the Caribbean Series.

Brinkley's winter success attracted the attention of the San Diego Padres, who signed him for the 1996 season at the age of 27. Assigned to the Single-A Rancho Cucamonga Quakes, Brinkley batted .363 and was named a California League All-Star. After spending two seasons in the Padres organization, Brinkley was dealt to the Pittsburgh Pirates, where he played for the Triple-A Nashville Sounds, and then the Rochester Red Wings of the Baltimore Orioles organization.

It was with the Orioles organization in 2001 that Brinkley nearly reached the major leagues. When he was not recalled by the Orioles when the roster expanded on September 1, 2001, Brinkley flew to Australia at the conclusion of the International League season. The Orioles recalled Brinkley on September 10; however, Brinkley was stranded in Australia due to the September 11, 2001 attacks. By the time Brinkley was able to return to the United States, the Orioles had instead recalled Tim Raines Jr. in his place.  Brinkley would not get another opportunity to play in the majors despite playing in the Triple-A All-Star game in 2002.  Brinkley would be granted free agency by the Orioles following the 2002 season.

Since 2003, Brinkley has bounced around Independent league baseball, playing in the Northeast League, Atlantic League and Northern League, where he landed with the Calgary Vipers in 2006. Brinkley's greatest success to date came with the Vipers in 2007, where he became the first player in Northern League history to finish the season with a .400 batting average. Brinkley also led the league in runs and on-base percentage, while his 150 hits also set a league record.  Brinkley was also named Baseball America's 2007 Independent League Player of the Year.

Through 2007, Brinkley is a career .329 hitter, having played in over 1,500 games. Brinkley is in his third season with the Vipers, now playing in the Golden Baseball League for the 2008 season, his 15th professional season. In 2009, Brinkley signed a contract with the Edmonton Capitals of the Golden Baseball League.

In 2010, Brinkley served as manager of the Yuma Scorpions in the Golden Baseball League.

2010 to 2013 was the hitting coach for Yaquis de Obregon in the LMP.

From 2011 to 2013 Brinkley was the hitting coach for Tigres de Quintana Roo in the Mexican Baseball League. 2014 was the hitting for Broncos de Reynosa.

In 2015, Brinkley was hired as the hitting coach for the Ogden Raptors. In 2016 Brinkley was the hitting coach in the Dominican Republic with the Cincinnati Reds Org. In 2017 he was the Bench coach in AAA for the Louisville Bats. He was named the hitting coach for the Dayton Dragons prior to the 2020 season.

References

External links

Mexican League statistics
Venezuelan Professional Baseball League statistics
Career statistics and player information from Korea Baseball Organization

1968 births
Living people
African-American baseball coaches
African-American baseball players
Alacranes de Campeche players
American expatriate baseball players in Canada
American expatriate baseball players in Mexico
American expatriate baseball players in South Korea
Baseball coaches from Connecticut
Baseball players from Connecticut
Bravos de Margarita players
American expatriate baseball players in Venezuela
Bridgeport Bluefish players
Calgary Vipers players
Canada Miners players
Caribes de Anzoátegui players
Diablos Rojos del México players
Edmonton Capitals players
Hyundai Unicorns players
KBO League outfielders
Leones de Yucatán players
Memphis Chicks players
Mexican League baseball outfielders
Minor league baseball managers
Minor league baseball coaches
Mobile BayBears players
Nashville Sounds players
New Jersey Jackals players
Piratas de Campeche players
Rancho Cucamonga Quakes players
Rochester Red Wings players
Sacred Heart Pioneers baseball players
Saskatoon Riot players
Sportspeople from Stamford, Connecticut
Toros de Tijuana players
Tuneros de San Luis Potosí players
Winnipeg Goldeyes players
21st-century African-American people
20th-century African-American sportspeople